Nikolai Gustavovich Legat (30 December 1869, Moscow – 24 January 1937, London) was a premier dancer with the Russian Imperial Ballet from 1888 to 1914, and also with the Mariinsky Ballet. Both he and his younger brother, Sergey, became ballet masters and caricaturists.

Legat is considered to be the main successor to Pavel Gerdt. Legat later served as a balletmaster in Russia, teaching and passing on the repertoire of the Imperial ballet company, whose groundwork was the legacy of the great choreographer-balletmaster, Marius Petipa. He left Russia with his third wife, Nadine, in 1922 and eventually settled in England in 1926. The couple opened their first ballet school in Kent. They were later able to start classes in Hammersmith, London. Among their notable pupils were Ninette de Valois and Margot Fonteyn.

Legat's wife, Nadine Nicolaeva, was a ballerina of the Imperial and State theatres of Moscow and St. Petersburg. She choreographed dances based on the Movements Exercises of Gurdjieff and later founded the Legat School of Ballet in Kent. One of her students was Anneliese von Oettingen. Nadine Nicolaeva-Legat was a follower of P. D. Ouspensky. She choreographed dances based on the Movements Exercises of G. I Gurdjieff. In 1938, Ouspensky and his followers acquired Colet House in London, from Nadine Legat, where they established the Historico-Psychological Society.

Legat's granddaughter, Tatiana Legat (1934-2022) was a Soviet and Russian ballerina, soloist in Leningrad Kirov Ballet (Mariinsky Theatre, St. Petersburg, Russia) and ballet pedagogue.

See also
List of dancers
List of Russian ballet dancers.

References

External links
Article from Andros on Ballet''

1869 births
1937 deaths
Ballet masters
Male ballet dancers from the Russian Empire
Choreographers of Mariinsky Theatre
Russian male ballet dancers
Imperial Choreographic School teachers